Tarzan the Magnificent is a book by American writer Edgar Rice Burroughs, the twenty-first in his series of twenty-four books about the title character Tarzan. It was originally published as two separate stories serialized in different pulp magazines; "Tarzan and the Magic Men" in Argosy from September to October, 1936, and "Tarzan and the Elephant Men" in Blue Book from November 1937 to January 1938. The two stories were combined under the title Tarzan the Magnificent in the first book edition, published in 1939 by Edgar Rice Burroughs, Inc. In order of writing, the book follows Tarzan's Quest and precedes Tarzan and the Forbidden City. In order of book publication it falls between the latter and Tarzan and the Foreign Legion.  The novel's plot bears no relation to that of the 1960 film of the same title.

Plot summary

Tarzan encounters a lost race with uncanny mental powers, after which he revisits the lost cities of Cathne and Athne, previously encountered in the earlier novel Tarzan and the City of Gold. As usual, he is backed up by Chief Muviro and his faithful Waziri warriors.

Sources

External links
 
  ERBzine.com Illustrated Bibliography entry for Edgar Rice Burroughs' Tarzan the Magnificent
 Edgar Rice Burroughs Summary Project page for Tarzan the Magnificent
 Text of the novel at Project Gutenberg Australia

1939 short story collections
Fantasy short story collections
Tarzan novels by Edgar Rice Burroughs
Short story collections by Edgar Rice Burroughs
Novels first published in serial form
Works originally published in Blue Book (magazine)
Works originally published in Argosy (magazine)